Some Things Are Better Left Unsaid may refer to:

 a 1964 song by Ketty Lester
 a song from the 1984 Daryl Hall and John Oates album Big Bam Boom
 a song from the 1994 Katey Sagal album Well...